Hambridge and Westport is a civil parish in Somerset, England. It had a population of 514 in 2011. The parish includes the villages of Hambridge and Westport, and is in the South Somerset district.

History and general information
Westport lies on the disused Westport Canal and Hambridge lies close to its junction with the River Isle.

Hambridge is most notable as the place at which Cecil Sharp was inspired by the Rev. Charles Marson, Vicar of Hambridge, to begin collecting folk songs.

The two villages, Hambridge and Westport share many resources including Parish Council, Church (the Church of St James the Less), Branch of the Royal British Legion and Recreation Trust who manage a recreation ground and Village Hall.

There is a thriving school and many additional clubs and societies use the Village Hall as a meeting venue. The Hall is often used for wedding receptions and for celebration events of all kinds. It has panoramic views across the Somerset Levels towards Burrow Hill.

Governance
The parish council has responsibility for local issues, including setting an annual precept (local rate) to cover the council’s operating costs and producing annual accounts for public scrutiny. The parish council evaluates local planning applications and works with the local police, district council officers, and neighbourhood watch groups on matters of crime, security, and traffic. The parish council's role also includes initiating projects for the maintenance and repair of parish facilities, as well as consulting with the district council on the maintenance, repair, and improvement of highways, drainage, footpaths, public transport, and street cleaning. Conservation matters (including trees and listed buildings) and environmental issues are also the responsibility of the council.

The parish falls within the Non-metropolitan district of South Somerset, which was formed on 1 April 1974 under the Local Government Act 1972, having previously been part of Langport Rural District. The district council is responsible for local planning and building control, local roads, council housing, environmental health, markets and fairs, refuse collection and recycling, cemeteries and crematoria, leisure services, parks, and tourism.

Somerset County Council is responsible for running the largest and most expensive local services such as education, social services, libraries, main roads, public transport, policing and  fire services, trading standards, waste disposal and strategic planning.

It is also part of the Somerton and Frome county constituency represented in the House of Commons of the Parliament of the United Kingdom. It elects one Member of Parliament (MP) by the first past the post system of election.

References

External links

 Village website
 Hambridge history website
 Hambridge School

Civil parishes in Somerset